Pierre Michel Nigro (born 4 September 1955), better known as Michael Fortunati, is an Italo disco/Eurobeat singer.

Biography
Pierre Nigro was born in the province of Brindisi, Apulia, Italy but grew up in Hem in the north of France, where he formed the group Carré D'As in the 1970s with his brothers. They released several albums in the 1980s. Nigro then began a solo career under the pseudonym Michael Fortunati, and met success with his first record "Give Me Up", released in the summer of 1986. It was a big hit in Belgium, France and Japan.

He is particularly well known in Japan, where the musical style Eurobeat is popular, and has released many albums and compilations in Japan alone. In 1987, Fortunati performed at the Tokyo Music Festival and won the Grand Prix award in the Disco & Dance Division. He has also appeared on several Japanese TV shows. "Give Me Up" has subsequently been covered by numerous Japanese singers such as BaBe, Yōko Nagayama, Beni Arashiro, Mi, Melon Kinenbi and Nami Tamaki.

Discography

Albums
Give Me Up (1987)
Alleluia (1988)
Fire (1989)
Big Bang (1991)
Baby Break It Up! (1995), Avex Trax
Dreamin''' (1997), Avex Trax

Compilation albumsThe World Remixes (1990)Remix It Up! (1995), Avex TraxThe Greatest Hits (1992)The Best of Michael Fortunati (Hyper NonStop Mix) (1995), Avex TraxBest of 2000 (2000), Victor EntertainmentGive Me Up – The Very Best of Michael Fortunati (2002), Toshiba EMIGive Me Up – The Complete Best of Michael Fortunati (2008)The Best of Disco Covers (2018)

Singles 
"Give Me Up" (1986)
"Alleluia" (1987)
"Gonna Get You" (Remix) (1987)
"Into the Night" (1987)
"Giochi di fortuna" (1987)
"Energyse" / "Mia Liberta" (a.k.a. "Boku No Yume") (1987)
"Let Me Down" (1988)
"Danse avec moi" (1989)
"ABC (It's Called)" (1989)
"Baby You" (1990)
"I'm Not a Freak" (1991)
"Big Bang" / "Tokyo Girl" (1991)
"Take Me On Up" / "Give Me Up" (Remix) (1992)
"Generate" (1993)
"Techno Cha Cha Cha" (1994)
"Baby Break It Up!" (1995)
"Koo Koo"/"C'est You! Oh No!"/"Hoochie Coo"/"Crazy Baby"
"Dreamin'" (1997)
"Give Me Up Is Still Alive" (with Laurent C) (2001)Japan Tour E.P. 01'' (2004)

References

External links
Myspace
Michael Fortunati's Facebook
Michael Fortunati on Discogs

1955 births
Living people
Italian Italo disco musicians
Eurobeat musicians
French people of Italian descent
People from the Province of Brindisi
People from Nord (French department)
20th-century Italian male singers
Avex Trax artists
EMI Music Japan artists